Prakash Aryal is 26th Chief of Nepal Police. He was appointed as the Chief of Nepal Police after succeeding Upendra Kant Aryal on 10 April 2017 by the cabinet decision of the Government of Nepal. He was elected by securing 154.2 points as compared to nearest rival DIG Nawaraj Silwal's 152.467 points after work point evaluation done by Supreme Court of Nepal. Previously, the Court revoked the February 12 decision of Nepal Government to appoint DIG Jaya Bahadur Chand after being challenged by seniormost DIG Nawaraj Silwal.Inspector General of Police (IGP).

References

External links
 Prakash Aryal (IGP Biography)

1963 births
Living people
People from Dang District, Nepal
Nepalese police officers
Inspectors General of Police (Nepal)
Tribhuvan University alumni
Khas people